Ismail Rasheed (born 20 April 1976) is a Maldivian film actor and director.
He has established a career in Maldivian films and is the recipient of several awards, including a Gaumee Film Award.

Biography 
Ismail Rasheed is a son of Maldivian poet, writer and the founder of the K.M.R. Production, Mohamed Rasheed.
Ismail Rasheed worked at the Maldives Airports Company Ltd, but he left his job to give more time for his Acting career.

He began his career in 1996 with a comedic role from Maldives Airport Authority's Tele Drama Zimmaa. He received the Best Comedian Award form the Tele Drama Awards for his role in Zimmaa. In the following year, he received the Best Comedian Award and the Best Actor Award for his role in Tele Drama Thafaathu, in which he played double role. He also received the Best Actor Award for the Tele Drama Leyattakai.

His first Feature Film was Edhi Edhi Hoadheemey of K.M.R. Production. He played a funny yet heartfelt role in the film. His second Feature Film was Heylaa, from which he won the Best Supporting Actor Award. His rich nature of acting was also seen from the films like, Moomin Fuad's Loodhifa and Hussain Munavvar's Sazaa.

Media image
In 2018, he was ranked in the first position from Dho?'s list of Top Ten Actor of Maldives.

Filmography

Feature Film

Television

Short Film

Other work

Television presenter
 Call Isse Live (2011)
 Hungaanu (2012)

Accolades

References

External links
 
 Kopee Isse's performance on Haveeru Online
 Racism in Maldives Film Industry on Haveeru Online

1976 births
Living people
People from Malé
Maldivian male film actors